The Valdostan regional election of 1963 took place on 27 October 1963.

Proportional representation became the standard electoral system in Italy, and it was adopted in Aosta Valley for the first time. The result was political instability, while political corruption arose. 

The alliance of 1959 was initially confirmed, but in 1966 the Socialist Party changed side and allied with the Christian Democracy.

Results

Sources: Regional Council of Aosta Valley and Istituto Cattaneo

Elections in Aosta Valley
1963 elections in Italy